Goran Samardziev (born May 24, 1981) is a retired Macedonian professional basketball Point guard who currently serves as a head coach for EuroNickel 2005 first team and assistant coach for Macedonia national basketball team.

Career
He started his career in Kavadarci with KK Tikvesh-Orka , after 2 years playing for KK Tikvesh-Orka he signed for KK Rabotnichki.

1981 births
Living people
Macedonian men's basketball players
Sportspeople from Kavadarci
Point guards
KK Vardar players
KK Rabotnički players